Nickolaus is a given name and a surname. Notable people with this name include the following:

Given name
Nickolaus Hirschl (1906–1991), Austrian wrestler
Nickolaus Mowrer, known as Nick Mowrer (born 1988), American sport shooter.

Surname
John M. Nickolaus Jr. (1913–1985), American cinematographer

See also

Nicholaus
Nicklaus (name)
Nickolas
Nikolaus (given name)